KK Crvena zvezda is a men's professional basketball club based in Belgrade, Serbia. Crvena zvezda is a part of the Adriatic Basketball Association and competes in the ABA League, EuroCup and in the Basketball League of Serbia. The team play domestic home matches in the Aleksandar Nikolić Hall, and the EuroLeague or EuroCup home matches in Štark Arena.

In March 2020, Crvena zvezda for its 75th Anniversary promoted the list as members of Club 100.

This list includes all players who have played at least 100 official games for Crvena Zvezda.

Key

List 
Note: Statistics are correct through the end of the 2021–22 season.

See also 
KK Crvena Zvezda all-time roster

References and notes

Red Star Belgrade
Lists of basketball players in Serbia